Su is the pinyin romanization of the common Chinese surname written  in simplified characters and  traditionally.

It was listed 42nd among the Song-era list of the Hundred Family Surnames.

In 2019 it was the 46th most common surname in mainland China.

Romanizations
The Wade form of the name is identical to the pinyin, but it is also sometimes irregularly romanized as Soo.

This Chinese name is also the source of the Vietnamese surname Tô; the Korean surname , which is romanized So; the Japanese surname , which is also romanized So; and the Filipino/Tagalog surname So. Also, the Filipino family name "Solon" is a Hispanicized version of So. The Solon clan coming from Cebu are famous for their ancestors who were government officials. The Solons were originally from Canton.

Distribution
Su was the 41st-most-common Chinese surname in the mainland during the 1982 census and the 45th-most-common in the 2007 report on household registrations released by the Chinese Ministry of Public Security. It has been listed as the 23rd-most-common Chinese surname in Taiwan.

Su is a somewhat common surname in the United States, listed 5,897th during the 1990 census and 3,835th during the year 2000 one. The other romanizations are less popular: So (8527 & 5167), Soo (17545 & 22160), Sou (77891 & 30226), Thu (49039 & 64912), and Soh (unlisted & 40074); Souw had fewer than one hundred resident bearers in the United States during both censuses and was unlisted both times.

Statistics Canada does not release surname lists from its censuses, but Su and So were both listed among the 200-most-common peculiarly Chinese-Canadian surnames in a 2010 survey of the Registered Persons Database of all current and former Canadian health card recipients in the province of Ontario.

Character decomposition
The character  was formed by the addition of the grass radical to the character  (s , sū, "revive"), itself a combination of the characters for "fish" (t , s , yú) and "grain" (hé).

Origins
The original pronunciation of 穌 has been reconstructed as *s.ŋˤa in Old Chinese, but this had already developed into su by the time of Middle Chinese. The addition of the grass radical suggests its original meaning was its use describing varieties of the mint perilla, but its general meaning today is as an abbreviation for Suzhou and replacement for a related word meaning "revive".

As with many Chinese surnames, however, there are a variety of separate legends and origins told about the current bearers of the name.

One origin derives from Fan, purported to be the eldest grandson of the six great-great-great-great-grandsons of the Yellow Emperor and said to have lived in Kunwu, the northeast region of Yuncheng in Shanxi. During the Xia dynasty, King Huai or Fen gave Yousu (}, modern Suling (?) in Henan) to the rulers of Kunwu as a fief and they established it as the State of Su. This perished in the late Shang dynastywhose fall was traditionally blamed upon the beautiful concubine Su Daji,but its rulers and people took the state's name as their clan name and moved elsewhere.

Another derives from Su Chasheng who was Minister of Justice under King Wu of the Zhou dynasty and revived the former region of Su as his fief, with a new capital city at Wen (modern Wen County in Henan). He is also considered to be the ancestor of the Wen family.

Prior to the Qin dynasty, the Su clan mainly resided in Henan and Hebei, but, during the Warring States period, one group moved southward into Hubei and Hunan and another west into Shaanxi. Under the Qin and Han, this Shaanxi clan became a prominent and distinguished family while a third group of clans moved east into Shandong.

Another origin was from a Han-era ethnic group in Liaodong, whose family name Wuyuanyousu was later shortened into Su during the Northern Wei.

Large numbers of Su moved into Sichuan and Fujian during the Tang dynasty. During the Northern Song, they moved further southward to Guizhou, Guangdong, and Guangxi. Their current relative popularity in Taiwan began following migrations during the Ming and Qing.

In the Philippines, the rare family name Solon derives from the surname So/Su.

Notable people with the surname Su

Historical
 Su Daji, the beautiful concubine traditionally blamed for the fall of the Shang dynasty
 Su Wu, a Western Han dynasty official
 Su Ze, an Eastern Han dynasty official
 Su Wei or Wuwei, a Sui-era official
 Su Liangsi, Duke of Wen, chancellor to Emperor Ruizong during the Tang dynasty
 Su Dingfang, Tang-era general
 The Three Sus (Chinese: , San Sū), the Chinese poets Su Shi, Su Xun, and Su Zhe
 Su Song, famous Song dynasty scientist who invented the world's first endless power chain drive and hydro-mechanical astronomical clock tower.
 Soh Kwang-pom, Korean reformist of the late Joseon dynasty
 Soh Jaipil, Korean independence activist and medical doctor
 Soh Hang-suen, Hong Kong Actress
 Su Shi, an ancient Chinese poet

Modern

 John So, former Lord Mayor of Melbourne
 Louisa So, Hong Kong actress
 Wesley So, Chinese Filipino chess prodigy
 William So, Hong Kong singer and actor
 Soh Hang Suen, former Hong Kong TVB actress
 Alec Su, Taiwanese singer and actor
 Su Bingqi, archaeologist
 Su Buqing, mathematician
 Su Chi, Minister of Mainland Affairs Council of the Republic of China
 Su Chih-fen, Magistrate of Yunlin County
 So Ji Sub, South Korean Actor
 Su Chin-shou, Hui chief of staff to General Ma Zhancang
 Su Chun-jung, Deputy Minister of Directorate-General of Personnel Administration of the Republic of China
 Su Jain-rong, Minister of Finance of the Republic of China
 Jen Su, TV presenter
 Lisa Su, CEO & President of Advanced Micro Devices (AMD)
 Su Li-chiung, former Deputy Minister of Health and Welfare of the Republic of China
 Su Tseng-chang, Premier of the Republic of China
 Charoen Sirivadhanabhakdi (Su Xuming), Thai billionaire businessman
 Su Yunying, Chinese singer
 Phillipa Soo, American actress and singer
 Kelvin Soo, Managing Director of Furley Bioextracts (FBIO)
 Su Shanshan, Chinese singer, actress, and member of Chinese idol group SNH48
 Oakley Neil H T Caesar-Su, known professionally as Central Cee, British rapper and songwriter

Tô (Vietnamese name of Su)
 Tô Hiến Thành, a Vietnamese official under the Lý dynasty
 Tô Trung Từ, a high ranking general and attempted usurper of the Lý dynasty

Soh (English name of Su)
 Soh Chin Aun, Malaysian Footballer
 Shigeru Soh, Japanese long-distance runner, twin brother of Takeshi
 Takeshi Soh, Japanese long-distance runner, twin brother of Shigeru
 June-Young Soh, South Korean director and musician
 Cavin Soh, Singaporean actor
 Elson Soh, Singaporean singer
 Debra W. Soh, Canadian neuroscientist and science journalist
 Soh Rui Yong, Singaporean long-distance runner
 Soh Wooi Yik, Malaysian badminton player
 Chunghee Sarah Soh, South Korean-born American anthropologist 
 Benny Soh, Singaporean film actor 
 Eugene Soh, Singaporean tech artist, Founder of Mind Palace

World Federation of Soh Associations
Over 1,000 representatives of Soh Clan Associations from around the world meet every two years at the Congress of the World Federation of Soh Associations. Participants hail from China, Taiwan, Singapore, Malaysia, Indonesia, Thailand, South Korea, the Philippines, Australia, America and Europe. The first congress was held in Manila in 1994.

References

Chinese-language surnames
Individual Chinese surnames

ko:소주 가씨